(born 11 March 1994) is a Japanese rower. She competed in the single sculls race at the 2012 Summer Olympics and placed 5th in Final D and 23rd overall.

References

1994 births
Living people
Japanese female rowers
Olympic rowers of Japan
Rowers at the 2012 Summer Olympics
Rowers at the 2018 Asian Games
Asian Games competitors for Japan